Brickellia stolonifera  is a Mexican species of flowering plants in the family Asteraceae. It has been found only in the state of Coahuila in north-central Mexico.

Brickellia stolonifera is similar to a species from nearby Chihuahua, B. simplex, but it has opposite leaves and flower heads grouped at the end of branches instead of in the axils of the leaves.

References

stolonifera
Flora of Coahuila
Plants described in 1982